The 2010 United Football Cup was the second edition of the United Football Cup, a Philippine football tournament, that ran from October 16, 2010 to January 22, 2011.  This edition consisted of 19 teams, which were separated into four groups with a single round-robin played in each to divide the groups into top-two and bottom-two clusters. The top two of every group qualified for the knock-out stage while the bottom-two clubs of each set, however, battled for the Plate. The eight teams who made it to the knock-out stages were given the right of playing in the league first division while teams who played for the Plate proceeded to the league second division.

Kaya were originally part of Group C. However, they withdrew from the cup. In accordance with Article 39 Section 1 of the UFL Rules and Regulations, Kaya were fined P200,000 for their move. They were replaced by Philippine Navy in Group C.

Global FC defeated Philippine Air Force to secure their first title while Loyola beat Pasargad in the plate finals.

Group stage

All times are Philippine Standard Time (PST) – UTC+8.

Group A

Group B

 ‡ Green Archers moved to the plate semi-finals for some unknown reasons.

Group C

Group D

Quarter-finals

Finals

Plate Semi-finals

Plate Finals

References 

United Football League Cup seasons
2010 domestic association football cups
Cup